The International Journal of Refugee Law is a peer reviewed academic journal of the law relating to forced migration. It is published by Oxford University Press.

External links
 Official webpage.

Oxford University Press academic journals
Law journals